Tylecodon paniculatus, also known as butter bush, butter tree, butterboom or rooisuikerblom (Afrikaans), is a species of succulent plant in the genus Tylecodon belonging to the family Crassulaceae.

Etymology
The genus name is a syllabic anagram of the former name Cotyledon, created by Helmut Toelken who split a few species off into a genus of their own.

The species Latin epithet refers to the shape of inflorescence — branched terminal panicles. 

The common names refer to soft, fleshy and brittle stems. For centuries children have used the soft, slippery stems as sleds.

Description
Tylecodon paniculatus is a thickset, robust succulent dwarf tree up to 2.5–3 m tall, with very fat stems with usually well branched rounded crown. The single main trunk and branches are covered with mustard-yellow to olive-green bark peeling in papery semi-translucent sheets. Branches are short, with prominent leaf scars. Leaves are clustered and spirally arranged around the apex of the growing tips simple during the wintertime; they are paddle-shaped, 5–12 cm long and 2–10 cm wide, thickly succulent, bright yellowish-green; apex is broadly tapering to rounded, base is tapering without petiole. The plant is deciduous. Inflorescences are spectacular slender, ascending thyrses to 40 cm, with bright crimson-red stalks. Flowers have five joined sepals and five joined petals, forming an orange-yellow to red urn-shaped tube 1.5–2.5 cm long with spreading lobes. Ten stamens are pendulous at first, then upright as the petal-tube dries. 

Hybridises with Tylecodon wallichii.

Habitat
Rocky slopes in Succulent Karoo.

Distribution
The species grows in the arid, winter rain-fall regions from Namibia to the southwestern South Africa.

Toxicity
The plant contains bufadienolide-type cardiac glycoside cotyledoside which causes cotyledonosis or nenta poisoning ("krimpsiekte") in sheep and goats.

Subspecies
 Tylecodon paniculatus subsp. paniculatus  — southwestern Namibia through to Cape Province. 
 Tylecodon paniculatus subsp. glaucus van Jaarsv. — Namibia.

Gallery

References

External links
 
 Bihrmann
 World of Succulents

Plants described in 1978
Flora of South Africa
Flora of Namibia
paniculatus
Taxa named by Hellmut R. Toelken